Pádraig Ó Siochfhradha (10 March 1883 – 19 November 1964) and his brother Mícheál Ó Siochfhradha were Irish language writers, teachers and storytellers, from County Kerry, Ireland.

Pádraig Ó Siochfhradha wrote under the Gaelic pen-name  ("The Hawk"; contemporary spelling An Seaḃac). His most famous book is the semi-autobiographical comedy Jimín Mháire Thaidhg, published in 1919, which follows his childhood under the control of his powerful mother, Máire. He became an active organiser for the Irish Volunteers in 1913 and was imprisoned three times for his activities. He was an independent member of Seanad Éireann from 1946–48, 1951–54 and 1957–64, being nominated by the Taoiseach on each occasion. He was secretary to the Irish Manuscripts Commission from October 1928 to October 1932.

Books
 Pádraig Ó Siochfhradha (An Seabhac), An Baile seo 'gainn-ne: Cnuasach Sgéal n-Úrnua, Cónnradh na Gaedhilge: Cló-Chuallacht Fódhla (1913)
 An Seabhac (Pádraig Ó Siochfhradha), Jimín Mháire Thaidhg, Comhlucht Oideachais na hÉireann (Educational Company of Ireland) (1919)
 An Seabhac, Jimín .i. eagrán scoile de "Jimín Mháire Thaidhg"  [Jimín i.e., a school edition of "Jimín Mháire Thaidhg"], Comhlucht Oideachais na hÉireann (Educational Company of Ireland) (1921)
 An Seabhac, Learner's English-Irish dictionary: for use in schools and colleges and by students in general, Comhlucht Oideachais na hÉireann (Educational Company of Ireland) (1923)
 An Seabhac, Seanfhocail na Muimhneach, Comhlucht Oideachais na hÉireann (Educational Company of Ireland) (1926)
 An Seabhac (ed.) Tóraidheacht an Ghiolla Dheacair agus a Chapaill, Comhlucht Oideachais na hÉireann (Educational Company of Ireland) (1939)
 An Seabhac (ed.) Tóraidheacht Dhiarmada agus Ghráinne, Comhlucht Oideachais na hÉireann (Educational Company of Ireland) (1939)
 An Seabhac (ed.) Laoithe na Féinne: Ceithre Laoithe agus Trí Fichid den bhFiannaigheacht, Dublin: Talbot Press (1941).
 An Seabhac, Seanfhocail na Mumhan [Seanfhocail na Muimhneach (1926) translated into Dublin standard Irish and expanded] by Pádraig Ua Maoileoin: An Gum (1984), 
 Pádraig Ó Siochfhradha, Jimeen: An Irish Comic Classic, [an English translation of Jimín Mháire Thaidhg], translated by Íde Ní Laoghaire and Peter Fallon, Dublin: O'Brien Press (1984)

References

External links

 Pádraig Ó Siochfhradha's Bio on Princess Grace Irish Library
 An Irish language school in Dingle which houses Pádraig Ó Siochfhradha's library
 Ó Beir Mo Dhúthracht leis An Seabhac - history and translation

Irish educators
Irish-language writers
Members of the 5th Seanad
Members of the 7th Seanad
Members of the 9th Seanad
Members of the 10th Seanad
Politicians from County Kerry
1883 births
1964 deaths
Nominated members of Seanad Éireann
Independent members of Seanad Éireann
Irish scholars and academics